Lippincott is an unincorporated community in Salem Township, Champaign County, Ohio, United States.

The community of Lippincott was never platted, but a general store was located here at one time.  Records are not clear as to when the store was built or opened, but there are no records of a Lippincott in the 1784 Atlas of Champaign County.  In 1914, the original building was purchased and demolished, and a new building stood in that spot until 1997.

The Mad River flows past, and the Mad River Wilderness Area is located here.

References 

Unincorporated communities in Champaign County, Ohio